The Rust Belt Derby was a soccer derby played between Detroit City FC, FC Buffalo, and AFC Cleveland in the National Premier Soccer League, the fourth tier of American soccer. The derby was named for the Rust Belt region of the United States. The RBD was created and sponsored by the supporter groups of the three clubs: The Situation Room (Buffalo), 6th City Syndicate (Cleveland), and the Northern Guard Supporters (Detroit).

The series was based on the results of games played between the three sides, much like the Cascadia Cup. Cleveland won the inaugural Rust Belt Derby on June 23, 2012 following a 1–1 draw with Detroit City.

AFC Cleveland folded following the 2017 season, and although Detroit City had been moved to a neighboring conference they continued the derby with a home-and-away series of friendlies against Buffalo, which saw Detroit win the trophy for the fourth consecutive time. Between 2017 and 2019 the derby was dormant, though it was functionally revived for the 2020 NISA Independent Cup when it was announced that Detroit City, FC Buffalo, and Cleveland SC would be competing together in the Great Lakes Division.

Results

NPSL era (2012–2016)
2012 Rust Belt Derby standings

2013 Rust Belt Derby standings

2014 Rust Belt Derby standings

2015 Rust Belt Derby standings

2016 Rust Belt Derby standings

NISA era (2020–2021)
2020 NISA Independent Cup — Great Lakes

2021 NISA Independent Cup — Great Lakes

Note: Livonia City FC were not eligible to win the Rust Belt Derby and could only claim the Great Lakes Region of the NISA Independent Cup

References

Soccer rivalries in the United States
Soccer cup competitions in the United States
Soccer in Michigan
Soccer in Ohio
Soccer in New York (state)
2012 establishments in the United States
Recurring sporting events established in 2012
Cleveland SC